Greenville is a bedroom community in New Castle County, Delaware, United States, and a suburb of Wilmington. The population was 2,326 at the 2010 census. For statistical purposes, the United States Census Bureau has defined Greenville as a census-designated place (CDP). The community is also home to the private residence of Joe Biden, the current president of the United States, and many Du Pont family descendants.

Geography

The Census Bureau definition of the area may not precisely correspond to the local understanding of the community.

Demographics

At the 2010 census there were 2,326 people, 1,076 households, and 654 families living in the CDP. The racial makeup of the CDP was 85.7% White, 4.8% African American, 7.2% Asian, 0.9% from other races, and 1.3% from two or more races. Hispanic or Latino of any race were 3.4%.

Of the 1,076 households 24.3% had children under the age of 18 living with them, 53.3% were married couples living together, 5.9% had a female householder with no husband present, 1.7% had a male householder with no wife present, and 39.2% were non-families. 34.5% of households were one person and 12.6% were one person aged 65 or older.  The average household size was 2.16 and the average family size was 2.79.

The age distribution was 21.1% under the age of 18, 3.7% from 18 to 24, 22.5% from 25 to 44, 28.8% from 45 to 64, and 24.0% 65 or older.  The median age was 46.6 years. For every 100 females age 18 and over, there were 89.6 males.

According to the American Community Survey, the median household income was in the CDP is $133,864, and the median family income  is $159,632. The per capita income for the CDP was $109,521.  None of the families and 2.5% of the population are living below the poverty line.

Greenville and Henlopen Acres are the two richest places in Delaware, all but tied for highest personal incomes, averaging over $80,000 per annum.

Education
Greenville is situated in the Red Clay Consolidated School District.

Its zoned schools are Brandywine Springs Elementary School, Alexis I. duPont Middle School, and Alexis I. duPont High School.

Points of interest 
 Alexis I. duPont High School
 Holladay-Harrington House
 St. Joseph's on the Brandywine

 Outside of the CDP but nearby
 John Carney Agricultural Complex
 Hagley Museum and Library
 Mt. Cuba Center
 Stockton-Montmorency
 Walnut Green School
 Wilmington Country Club
 Winterthur Museum, Garden and Library

Notable people
Harry Anderson professional baseball player 
Jill Biden, First Lady of the United States (2021–present), Second Lady of the United States (2009-2017)
Joe Biden, 46th President of the United States (2021–present), 47th Vice President of the United States (2009-2017)
Hallie Olivere Biden, daughter-in-law of Joe Biden
Alfred I. du Pont, businessman and philanthropist
Eleuthère Irénée du Pont, chemist and founder of the company which eventually became the E.I. du Pont de Nemours Company
Francis Irénée du Pont, industrialist
Henry A. du Pont, Medal of Honor recipient and Republican United States Senator
Lammot du Pont Copeland, president of the E.I. du Pont de Nemours Company
Pierre Samuel du Pont de Nemours, French-American writer, economist, and politician
Pierre S. du Pont, IV, Republican governor and congressman
T. Coleman du Pont, president of the E.I. du Pont de Nemours Company and Republican United States Senator
 Ted Kaufman, Democratic United States Senator
 Jim Thompson, businessman and U.S. military intelligence officer, disappeared under mysterious circumstances
 Herman E. Schroeder, DuPont researcher
 Johnny Weir, figure skater

References

External links

Census-designated places in New Castle County, Delaware
Census-designated places in Delaware